Witinski Villa is a community or populated place (Class Code U6) located in Luzerne County, Pennsylvania, at latitude 41.18 and longitude -75.948. The elevation is 1,004 feet. Witinski Villa appears on the Wilkes-Barre West U.S. Geological Survey Map. Luzerne County is in the Eastern time zone.

Geography of Luzerne County, Pennsylvania